Dermatobranchus piperoides is a species of sea slug, a nudibranch, a marine gastropod mollusc in the family Arminidae.

Distribution
This species was described from Réunion, Indian Ocean.

References

Arminidae
Gastropods described in 2011